Eomellivora is an extinct genus of prehistoric mustelids, closely related to the honey badger, known from Eurasia and North America, and tentatively Africa. It was one of the biggest mustelids ever known, bigger and more hypercarnivorous than the modern wolverine.

Eomellivora was long thought to contain only one species, E. wimani, with Wolsan and Semenov (1996) treating E. piveteaui as a younger subspecies of E. wimani, but new remains of E. piveteaui described in 2015 allowed for recognition of E. piveteaui as distinct from E. wimani, but also treatment of E. ursogulo (Orlov, 1948) and E. hungarica Kretzoi, 1942 from the eastern Paratethys region. The placement of the African species Eomellivora tugenensis in Eomellivora is tentative.

Taxonomy 

The genus Hadrictis Pia, 1939, described from a skull found in late Miocene deposits in Austria, is a synonym of Eomellivora.

References 

Miocene carnivorans
Prehistoric mustelids
Fossil taxa described in 1924
Prehistoric carnivoran genera